The 1948 Monaco Grand Prix was a Grand Prix motor race, held in Monte Carlo on 16 May 1948.

The first event under a new formula, 1½ litres supercharged or 4½ litres naturally aspirated, it featured a motley crowd of marques. Jean-Pierre Wimille's  Simca-Gordini took an early lead, but was overwhelmed by the Maserati 4CLs of Giuseppe Farina and then Luigi Villoresi. Farina would take the win.

Classification

References

Kettlewell, Mike. "Monaco: Road Racing on the Riviera", in Northey, Tom, editor. World of Automobiles, Volume 12, pp. 1381–4. London: Orbis, 1974.

Monaco Grand Prix
Monaco Grand Prix
Grand Prix
Monaco Grand Prix